There are a number of unincorporated communities in Dunn County, Wisconsin. These fall into four basic types:
Historical communities (no longer in existence) (†), some remain as ghost towns (‡)
Former communities since annexed into larger municipalities (*)
Modern-day small communities, too small to consider incorporation (§)
Modern-day areas recognized as census-designated places by the United States Census Bureau (°)

This incomplete list, arranged here as they fall within present-day divisions of Dunn County, these are:

Town of Dunn
Downsville §
Dunnville §
Town of Eau Galle
Eau Galle §
Welch Point
Town of Hay River
Baxter
City of Menomonie
Menomonie Junction, Wisconsin *
North Menomonie, Wisconsin *
Town of Menomonie
Cedar Falls §
Irvington §
Town of New Haven
Connorsville §
Graytown § (partial)
Town of Peru
Meridean §
Old Tyrone ‡
Red Cedar
Old Meridean ‡
Town of Red Cedar
Rusk §
Town of Rock Creek
Caryville §
Rock Falls §
Town of Sand Creek
Sand Creek §
Town of Spring Brook
Elk Lake §
Falls City §
Town of Tainter
Norton
Tainter Lake °
Town of Weston
Comfort §
Hatchville §
Weston §

Notes

 
Unincorporated communities Dunn